Oyak Renault GSD is a sports organisation of Renault Automobile Factory in Bursa. The football club plays in the TFF Third League, which they were relegated to in 2007. Its basketball section plays in the top-level Beko Basketball League.

Association football clubs established in 1974
Oyak Renault
Sport in Bursa
Football clubs in Turkey
1974 establishments in Turkey